Meadea is a historic home located at White Post, Clarke County, Virginia. It was built prior to 1760 consisting of just two rooms and loft. It had a central stone chimney with two hearths. One hearth was for cooking. The cooking hearth is still visible on the now outside of the home.

An aid to George Washington, Col. Richard Kidder Meade (1746-1805), of the American Revolutionary War, after the war, bought a large tract of land in the valley of Virginia on the advice of George Washington. The small frontier cabin was included in the tract of land and Meade enlarged it by adding to the west end of the cabin about 1784, to be a temporary home until a larger home could be built (Lucky Hit). Bishop William Meade was born at Meadea and raised at Lucky Hit. Meadea is now a -story, three bay, log dwelling with a gable roof.  It rests on a stone foundation and has an attached stone chimney.  It is the only remaining 18th century log building in White Post. A descendant of Col. Meade now lives at Meadea.

It was listed on the National Register of Historic Places in 1995.  It is located in the White Post Historic District.

References

Houses on the National Register of Historic Places in Virginia
Colonial architecture in Virginia
Houses completed in 1784
Houses in Clarke County, Virginia
National Register of Historic Places in Clarke County, Virginia
Individually listed contributing properties to historic districts on the National Register in Virginia
Log buildings and structures on the National Register of Historic Places in Virginia
Meade family of Virginia